Galand Thaxton (born October 23, 1964) is a former American football linebacker. He played for the Atlanta Falcons in 1989 and for the San Diego Chargers in 1991.

References

1964 births
Living people
American football linebackers
Wyoming Cowboys football players
Atlanta Falcons players
San Diego Chargers players